The 1989 NCAA Division I men's basketball championship game was the final round of the 1989 NCAA Division I men's basketball tournament. It determined the national champion for the 1988–89 NCAA Division I men's basketball season, and was contested by the Southeast Regional Champions, No. 3-seeded Michigan Wolverines and the West Regional Champions, No. 3-seeded Seton Hall Pirates. Both teams were seeking their first national title. The game was played on April 3, 1989, at the Kingdome in Seattle, Washington. Michigan defeated Seton Hall, 80–79 in OT, to claim their first NCAA title. It was also the first title for interim head coach Steve Fisher. Wolverine senior forward Glen Rice was named the NCAA Tournament Most Outstanding Player (MOP) as he established the tournament scoring record with 184 points.

Participating teams

Michigan

First round vs. #14 Xavier

Second Round vs. #11 South Alabama

Regional semifinals vs. #2 North Carolina

Regional finals vs. #5 Virginia

Final Four vs. #1 Illinois

Seton Hall

First round vs. #14 Southwest Missouri State

Second Round vs. #11 Evansville

Regional semifinals vs. #2 Indiana

Regional finals vs. #4 UNLV

Final Four vs. #2 Duke

Starting lineups

Game summary

Michigan trailed by three, 79–76, with less than a minute remaining in overtime when Terry Mills hit a turnaround 11-footer to cut the Seton Hall lead to 79–78. After a defensive stop, the Pirates' Gerald Greene fouled Rumeal Robinson with three seconds left in overtime. Robinson made both free throws, and, after Seton Hall's last-second shot came up short, Michigan won its first national championship.

References

NCAA Division I men's basketball championship game
NCAA Division I Men's Basketball Championship Games
Michigan Wolverines men's basketball
Seton Hall Pirates men's basketball
College sports tournaments in Washington (state)
Basketball competitions in Seattle
NCAA Division I men's basketball championship game
NCAA Division I Basketball Championship Game, 1989
NCAA Division I Basketball Championship Game